Robert Combe may refer to:

Bobby Combe (1924–1991), Scottish footballer
Robert Combe (MP) for Lostwithiel (UK Parliament constituency) and Liskeard
Robert Grierson Combe (1880–1917), Canadian recipient of the Victoria Cross
Robert Forbes Combe (1912–1952), Scottish chess player